Martín Michel may refer to:

 Martín Michel (footballer) (born 1983), Argentine footballer
 Martín Michel (judoka) (born 1994), Bolivian judoka